The blue shark (Prionace glauca), also known as the great blue shark, is a species of requiem shark, in the family Carcharhinidae, which inhabits deep waters in the world's temperate and tropical oceans. It is listed as Near Threatened by the IUCN.

Although generally lethargic, they can move very quickly. Blue sharks are viviparous and are noted for large litters of 25 to over 100 pups. They feed primarily on small fish and squid, although they can take larger prey. Maximum lifespan is still unknown, but it is believed that they can live up to 20 years.

Anatomy and appearance
Blue sharks are light-bodied with long pectoral fins. Like many other sharks, blue sharks are countershaded: the top of the body is deep blue, lighter on the sides, and the underside is white. The blue shark is also ectothermic and it has a unique sense of smell.

Reproduction

They are viviparous, with a yolk-sac placenta, delivering 4 to 135 pups per litter. The gestation period is between 9 and 12 months. Females mature at five to six years of age and males at four to five. Courtship is believed to involve biting by the male, as mature specimens can be accurately sexed according to the presence or absence of bite scarring. Female blue sharks have adapted to the rigorous mating ritual by developing skin three times as thick as male skin.

Ecology

Range and habitat
In temperate seas it may approach shore, where it can be observed by divers; while in tropical waters, it inhabits greater depths. It lives as far north as Norway and as far south as Chile. Blue sharks are found off the coasts of every continent, except Antarctica. Its greatest Pacific concentrations occur between 20° and 50° North, but with strong seasonal fluctuations. Records from the Atlantic show a regular clockwise migration within the prevailing currents.

Feeding
Squid are the most important prey for blue sharks, but their diet includes other invertebrates, such as cuttlefish, blanket octopuses, and pelagic octopuses, as well as lobster, shrimp, crab, a large number of bony fishes (such as long-snouted lancetfish, snake mackerel and oilfish), small sharks, mammalian carrion and occasional sea birds (such as great shearwaters). Whale and porpoise blubber and meat have been retrieved from the stomachs of captured specimens and they are known to take cod from trawl nets. Sharks have been observed and documented working together as a "pack" to herd prey into a concentrated group from which they can easily feed. Blue sharks may eat tuna, which have been observed taking advantage of the herding behaviour to opportunistically feed on escaping prey. The observed herding behaviour was undisturbed by different species of shark in the vicinity that normally would pursue the common prey. The blue shark can swim at fast speeds, allowing it to catch up with prey easily. Its triangular teeth allow it to easily catch hold of slippery prey.

Predators
Young and smaller individuals may be eaten by larger sharks, such as the great white shark and the tiger shark. Orcas have been reported to hunt blue sharks. This shark may host several species of parasites. For example, the blue shark is a definitive host of the tetraphyllidean tapeworm, Pelichnibothrium speciosum (Prionacestus bipartitus). It becomes infected by eating intermediate hosts, probably opah (Lampris guttatus) and/or longnose lancetfish (Alepisaurus ferox).

Northern elephant seals (Mirounga angustirostris) and Cape fur seals (Arctocephalus pusillus pusillus) have been observed to feed on blue sharks.

Relationship to humans
Blue shark meat is edible, but not widely sought after; it is consumed fresh, dried, smoked and salted and diverted for fishmeal. There is a report of high concentration of heavy metals (mercury and lead) in the edible flesh. The skin is used for leather, the fins for shark-fin soup and the liver for oil. Blue sharks are occasionally sought as game fish for their beauty and speed.

Blue sharks rarely bite humans. From 1580 up until 2013, the blue shark was implicated in only 13 biting incidents, four of which ended fatally.

In captivity

Blue sharks, like most pelagic sharks, tend to fare poorly in captivity. The first attempt of keeping blue sharks in captivity was at Sea World San Diego in 1968, and since then a small number of other public aquariums in North America, Europe and Asia have attempted it. Most of these were in captivity for about three months or less, and some of them were released back to the wild afterwards. The record time for blue sharks in captivity is 246 and 224 days for two individuals at Tokyo Sea Life Park, 210 days for an individual at New Jersey Aquarium, and 194 days for one at Lisbon Oceanarium and 252 and 873 days for two individuals at Sendai Umino-Mori Aquarium.  

The blue shark that survived the longest in captivity was captured in Shizugawa Bay on July 27, 2018, and taken to the Sendai Umino-Mori Aquarium. After that, it lived for 873 days, but died due to factors such as disordered swimming due to dehydration. This growth rate is said to be the same as that of wild blue sharks.

Blue sharks are relatively easy to feed and store in captivity, and the three primary issues appear to be transport, predation by larger sharks and trouble avoiding smooth surfaces in tanks. However, this typical small size when introduced to aquariums means that they are highly vulnerable to predation by other sharks that are often kept, such as bull, grey reef, sandbar and sand tiger sharks. For example, several blue sharks kept at Sea World San Diego initially did fairly well, but were eaten when bull sharks were added to their exhibit. Attempts of keeping blue sharks in tanks of various sizes, shapes and depths have shown that they have trouble avoiding walls, aquarium windows and other smooth surfaces, eventually leading to abrasions to the fins or snout, which may result in serious infections. To keep blue sharks, it is therefore necessary with tanks that allow for relatively long, optimum swimming paths where potential contact with smooth surfaces is kept at a minimum. It has been suggested that prominent rockwork may be easier to avoid for blue sharks than smooth surfaces, as has been shown in captive tiger sharks.

Conservation status

In June 2018 the New Zealand Department of Conservation classified the blue shark as "Not Threatened" with the qualifier "Secure Overseas" under the New Zealand Threat Classification System. The species is listed as Near Threatened by the IUCN.

See also

 Outline of sharks
 List of sharks
 List of prehistoric cartilaginous fish genera

References

External links

 
 
 
 ARKive – Images and movies of the blue shark (Prionace glauca)
 Canadian Shark research laboratory
 BBCNews – 'Jaws' comes to a US beach 3 August 2010.
 BBCNews – Footage of shark which closed New Quay (Wales) beach 8 August 2012.
 Species Description of Prionace glauca at www.shark-references.com
 
 Prionace glauca discussed on RNZ Critter of the Week, 12 August 2022

blue shark
Viviparous fish
Cosmopolitan fish
Extant Pliocene first appearances
blue shark
blue shark